Amy Turner (born 31 July 1984) is an English rugby union player.

Playing career
She represented  at the 2010 Women's Rugby World Cup. She started playing rugby at the age of 5. She returned from injury for England's match against  in their 2010 Women's Six Nations Championship match.

References

External links
Player Profile

1984 births
Living people
England women's international rugby union players
English female rugby union players